Dillon Heatherington (born May 9, 1995) is a Canadian professional ice hockey defenceman and captain of the Belleville Senators of the American Hockey League (AHL) while under contract to the Ottawa Senators of the National Hockey League (NHL). Heatherington was selected by the Columbus Blue Jackets in the second-round (50th overall) of the 2013 NHL Entry Draft.

Playing career
Heatherington began his major junior hockey career with the Swift Current Broncos of the Western Hockey League (WHL) during the 2011–12 season. After two years, he developed into one of the league's best defensive defencemen, tasked with shutting down the opposing team's top forwards, playing alongside Reece Scarlett. During the 2012–13 season, he played with Team Canada to win a gold medal at the 2013 IIHF World U18 Championships. Leading up to the 2013 NHL Entry Draft, Heatherington was lauded as a top prospect. He played his entire junior career with Swift Current, scoring 13 goals and 84 points in 237 games.

Heatherington was selected by the Columbus Blue Jackets in the second round, 50th overall in the 2013 NHL Entry Draft. On March 1, 2015, Heatherington's signed a three-year entry-level contract with the Blue Jackets. In his first full professional season in 2015–16, Heatherington was assigned to the Blue Jackets new American Hockey League (AHL) affiliate, the Lake Erie Monsters. As a staple of the Monsters defense corps, Heatherington appeared in 63 games adding 19 points. In the post-season, he collected 3 assists in 15 games as he helped contribute to the Monsters claiming the Calder Cup in his rookie season. During the following 2016–17 season, Heatherington battled injury and collected 6 points in 38 games with the renamed Cleveland Monsters before he was dealt at the NHL trade deadline by the Blue Jackets to the Dallas Stars in exchange for Lauri Korpikoski on March 1, 2017. He was subsequently sent down to the Stars AHL affiliate, the Texas Stars.

Heatherington was called up by the Stars on January 13, 2018, to replace Marc Methot, who was placed on injured reserve (IR). He played his first career NHL game against the team that drafted him, the Columbus Blue Jackets, on January 18, 2018. He recorded his first NHL point in a shootout win against the Pittsburgh Penguins on February 9, 2018, by assisting on Tyler Seguin's first period goal. He appeared in six games with Dallas before being sent back to the AHL. That season he narrowly missed winning his second Calder Cup after the Texas Stars were defeated by the Toronto Marlies in seven games. He re-signed with Dallas in the offseason on July 16, 2018 to a one-year two-way contract. In the 2018–19 season, Heatherington played in five games with the Stars registering one point.

Having left the Stars organization as a free agent after four seasons, Heatherington signed his first contract abroad, agreeing to a one-year contract with Kazakh club, Barys Nur-Sultan of the Kontinental Hockey League (KHL) on November 2, 2020. He played in 41 games with Barys scoring two goals and seven points.

After a lone season in the KHL with Barys, Heatherington returned to North America and the NHL in agreeing to a one-year, two-way contract with the Ottawa Senators on July 29, 2021.

Career statistics

Regular season and playoffs

International

Awards and honours

References

External links 

1995 births
Living people
Barys Nur-Sultan players
Belleville Senators players
Canadian ice hockey defencemen
Cleveland Monsters players
Columbus Blue Jackets draft picks
Dallas Stars players
Lake Erie Monsters players
Ottawa Senators players
Ice hockey people from Calgary
Springfield Falcons players
Swift Current Broncos players
Texas Stars players